Walker High School may refer to the following schools in the United States:

 Walker High School (Jasper, Alabama)
 Walker High School (Atlanta), Georgia
 O. Perry Walker High School in New Orleans, Louisiana
 Walker High School (Walker, Louisiana), listed on the NRHP in Louisiana
 Warren-Walker High School, Henderson, Nevada
 Walker Valley High School, Bradley County, Tennessee
 Maggie L. Walker High School, Richmond, Virginia